Mal-e Qayed (also Romanized as Māl-e Qāyed and Māl-e Qā’ed; also known as Mal Gha’eh) is a village in Hayat Davud Rural District of the Central District of Ganaveh County, Bushehr province, Iran. At the 2006 census, its population was 2,204 in 488 households. The following census in 2011 counted 3,092 people in 801 households. The latest census in 2016 showed a population of 4,564 people in 1,273 households; it was the largest village in its rural district.

References 

Populated places in Ganaveh County